Islamabad International Airport is the international airport serving Islamabad, the capital city of Pakistan.

The airport commenced full operations in 6 May  2018, replacing the defunct Benazir Bhutto International Airport which now forms part of the PAF Base Nur Khan. It is the largest cargo airport in Pakistan and also in terms of area and passenger capacity, capable of serving 9 million passengers yearly. Further expansions in the future will allow it to serve up to 25 million passengers yearly. It is the second busiest airport in Pakistan in terms of passenger traffic after Jinnah International Airport, Karachi. The terminal includes 15 gates with ten remote gates, duty-free shops, a food court and 42 immigration counters. Pakistan Civil Aviation Authority is acquiring 2,833 acres (11.46 km2 / 4.42 sq mi) of land to build a third runway. It is the first and only airport in Pakistan capable of handling the Airbus A380. A metrobus rapid transit service connects the airport with Islamabad and Rawalpindi, it was completed on 18 April 2022.

History and details 

Construction of the Islamabad International Airport (ICAO: OPIS) began on 7 April 2007 and was inaugurated formally on 20 April 2018 for regular international and domestic flights.

The plan to construct a new airport was announced in January 2005 by the Pakistan Civil Aviation Authority.  A land of  land was acquired at the cost of Rs 2.5 billion in November 2005.

The new airport was planned in response to increasing air traffic and passenger loads at the existing Benazir Bhutto International Airport. It was estimated that the number of passengers at the former airport was growing by 14 percent annually compared to the national air passenger growth rate of 4 percent, making it the second busiest airport in the country at the time. Therefore, a site in Ranjha, Attock district was selected as the site for the construction of a new airport just a few kilometers from the Islamabad interchange on M-1/M-2 motorways. The foundation stone of the project was laid by former President Pervez Musharraf and Prime Minister Shaukat Aziz on 7 April 2007.

It was a project of the Pakistan Civil Aviation Authority (PCAA) and designed by French company Aéroports de Paris Ingenierie (ADPi) and CPG Corporation of Singapore. The whole project was financed by PCAA on its own. It is built on more than 3,200 acres of land and consists of a passenger terminal building, 2 runways, taxiways, and apron and parking bays for wide-body aircraft. There is also a cargo terminal, air traffic control complex, fuel farm, as well as a fire, crash, and rescue facility. The site of the airport is near Fateh Jang Tehsil of Attock District. It is 25 km equidistant from Zero Point, Islamabad and from Saddar, Rawalpindi. The airport is on par with international standards & serves as a major hub for all aviation activities in Pakistan.

The PCAA asked a team of British architects to design the new airport. PCAA signed an agreement with the Louis Berger Group in the US in association with Pakistani consulting firm GT AASR, to undertake project management services. The airport was to complete in 5 years but took 12 years to complete resulting in a 3 times increase in cost. On 1 May 2018, Prime Minister Shahid Khaqan Abbasi officially inaugurated the new airport. This was followed up with the airport commencing full commercial flight operations on 3 May 2018 and thus replacing the old airport.

On 8 July 2018, the first Airbus A380 landed in Islamabad, arriving as Emirates flight EK-2524 from Dubai International Airport. This flight had no seats for sale but the first time an Airbus A380 landed in Pakistan.

Pakistan International Airlines has moved its international hub from Karachi's Jinnah International Airport to Islamabad International Airport, better reflecting the origin of its international passengers.

Facilities 

Islamabad International Airport has a 180,000m² modular terminal building which is capable of handling 9 million passengers and 80,000 metric tons cargo per annum. The numbers are expected to reach 25 million passengers by 2024. Being a new airport, a significant portion of the land has been earmarked for commercial purposes such as duty-free shops, a hotel and convention center, air malls, a business centre, food courts, and leisure and cinema facilities.

Airlines and destinations

Passenger

: Air China's flight from Islamabad to Beijing make a stop over in Karachi. However, the airline has no traffic rights to transport passengers solely between Islamabad and Karachi.

Cargo

Statistics

Ground transport 

The airport is connected to Islamabad via the Srinagar Highway and Rawalpindi via the GT Road (Highway N-5). A four-lane highway is also under construction to serve cargo traffic.

See also 
 List of airports in Pakistan
 List of the busiest airports in Pakistan
 Airlines of Pakistan
 Pakistan Civil Aviation Authority
 Pakistan International Airlines
 Shaheen Airport Services
 Transport in Pakistan

References

Bibliography

 Ground breaking ceremony of new Islamabad airport likely in April , Business Recorder (Pakistan's Financial Daily Newspaper), 2005-03-03.
 CAA initiates $300m new Islamabad airport (NIIA), Pakistan Link Headline News, 2006-01-07.
 CAA initiates $300m new Islamabad airport project, The News Business Section, 2006-01-07.
 New Islamabad International Airport ready for ground breaking Ceremony, PakTribune, 2006-02-07.
 The ground laying ceremony at Fateh Jang, Attock 2007 video at YouTube
 Launched: Islamabad joins league of top airports

External links

 Islamabad International Airport website
 
 
 

Islamabad
International airports in Pakistan
2018 establishments in Pakistan
Attock District
Airports in Islamabad
Airports in Punjab, Pakistan
Transport in Rawalpindi